Porten is a surname. Notable people with the surname include:

 Franz Porten (1859–1932), German actor and film director
 Harri Porten (born 1972), German software engineer
 Henny Porten (1890–1960), German actress and film producer
 Rosa Porten (1884–1972), German screenwriter, actress, and director

See also
 Morten
 Porter (name)